The 2015 College Football All-America Team includes those players of American college football who have been honored by various selector organizations as the best players at their respective positions.  The selector organizations award the "All-America" honor annually following the conclusion of the fall college football season.  The original All-America team was the 1889 College Football All-America Team selected by Caspar Whitney and Walter Camp.  In 1950, the National Collegiate Athletic Bureau, which is the National Collegiate Athletic Association's (NCAA) service bureau, compiled the first list of All-Americans including first-team selections on teams created for a national audience that received national circulation with the intent of recognizing selections made from viewpoints that were nationwide.  Since 1957, College Sports Information Directors of America (CoSIDA) has bestowed Academic All-American recognition on male and female athletes in Divisions I, II, and III of the NCAA as well as National Association of Intercollegiate Athletics athletes, covering all NCAA championship sports.

The 2015 College Football All-America Team is composed of the following College Football All-American first teams chosen by the following selector organizations: Associated Press (AP), Football Writers Association of America (FWAA), American Football Coaches Association (AFCA), Walter Camp Foundation (WCFF), The Sporting News (TSN), Sports Illustrated (SI), USA Today (USAT) ESPN, CBS Sports (CBS), College Football News (CFN), Scout.com, and Yahoo! Sports (Yahoo!).

Currently, the NCAA compiles consensus all-America teams in the sports of Division I-FBS football and Division I men's basketball using a point system computed from All-America teams named by coaches associations or media sources.  Players are chosen against other players playing at their position only.  To be selected a consensus All-American, players must be chosen to the first team on at least two of the five official selectors as recognized by the NCAA.  Second- and third-team honors are used to break ties.  Players named first-team to all five selectors are deemed unanimous All-Americans. Currently, the NCAA recognizes All-Americans selected by the AP, AFCA, FWAA, TSN, and the WCFF to determine consensus and unanimous All-Americans.

In 2015, there were 26 consensus All-Americans, 12 of which were unanimous. Unanimous selections are listed with an asterisk.

Offense

Quarterback
Trevone Boykin, TCU (WCFF-2)
Baker Mayfield, Oklahoma (AP-2, WCFF-1, TSN-1, SI)
Keenan Reynolds, Navy (AP-3)
Deshaun Watson, Clemson -- CONSENSUS -- (AP-1, FWAA, AFCA, TSN-2, WCFF-2, USAT, CBS, ESPN, Athlon)

Running back
Dalvin Cook, Florida State (AP-2, FWAA, TSN-2, WCFF-2, SI, Athlon)
Ezekiel Elliott, Ohio State (AP-2)
Leonard Fournette, LSU -- CONSENSUS -- (AP-1, WCFF-1, FWAA, TSN-2, CBS, ESPN)
Royce Freeman, Oregon (AP-3)
Derrick Henry, Alabama -- UNANIMOUS -- (AP-1, WCFF-1, FWAA, AFCA, TSN-1, USAT, CBS, SI, ESPN, Athlon)
Christian McCaffrey, Stanford (AFCA, TSN-1, WCFF-2, USAT)
Larry Rose III, New Mexico State (AP-3)

Wide receiver
Corey Coleman, Baylor -- UNANIMOUS -- (AP-1, WCFF-1, FWAA, TSN-1, AFCA, USAT, CBS, SI, ESPN, Athlon)
Josh Doctson, TCU -- UNANIMOUS -- (AP-1, WCFF-1, FWAA, TSN-1, AFCA, USAT, CBS, SI, Athlon)
Will Fuller, Notre Dame (AP-2, TSN-2)
Roger Lewis, Bowling Green (AP-3)
Tajae Sharpe, UMass (WCFF-2)
Sterling Shepard, Oklahoma (ESPN)
JuJu Smith-Schuster, Southern California (AP-2, TSN-2)
Laquon Treadwell, Ole Miss (AP-3, WCFF-2)

Tight end
Jake Butt, Michigan (AP-2, TSN-2, CBS, SI)
Hunter Henry, Arkansas -- UNANIMOUS -- (AP-1, WCFF-1, TSN-1, AFCA, USAT, ESPN, Athlon)
Austin Hooper, Stanford (AP-3)
Jordan Leggett, Clemson (WCFF-2)

Offensive line
Vadal Alexander, LSU (AP-3, TSN-2, WCFF-2)
Jack Allen, Michigan State (AP-1, WCFF-2, CBS, SI)
Austin Blythe, Iowa (AP-3)
Jack Conklin, Michigan State (AP-2, TSN-1, WCFF-2, USAT, Athlon)
Taylor Decker,  Ohio State -- CONSENSUS -- (AP-1, WCFF-1, AFCA, TSN-2, CBS, SI)
Spencer Drango, Baylor -- UNANIMOUS -- (AP-1, WCFF-1, FWAA, TSN-1, AFCA, USAT, CBS, SI, ESPN, Athlon)
Pat Elflein, Ohio State (AP-2)
Dan Feeney, Indiana (AP-3, ESPN)
Joshua Garnett, Stanford -- UNANIMOUS -- (AP-1, WCFF-1, FWAA, AFCA, TSN-1, USAT, CBS, SI, ESPN, Athlon)
Roderick Johnson, Florida State (TSN-2)
Ryan Kelly, Alabama -- CONSENSUS -- (AP-2, WCFF-1, FWAA, AFCA, TSN-1, USAT, ESPN, Athlon)
Jason Spriggs, Indiana (AP-3, FWAA, TSN-2, WCFF-2)
Ronnie Stanley, Notre Dame -- CONSENSUS -- (AP-2, WCFF-1, FWAA, TSN-1, AFCA, CBS, ESPN)
Joe Thuney, North Carolina State (AP-3, USAT)
Sebastian Tretola, Arkansas (AP-2, TSN-2, SI)
Laremy Tunsil, Ole Miss (WCFF-2)
Landon Turner, North Carolina (AP-1, Athlon)

Defense

Defensive line
Andrew Billings, Baylor (AP-1, TSN-2, ESPN, Athlon)
Joey Bosa, Ohio State -- CONSENSUS -- (AP-2, WCFF-1, AFCA, TSN-2, USAT, CBS, SI, ESPN, Athlon)
DeForest Buckner, Oregon (AP-2, USAT)
Jonathan Bullard, Florida (AP-3, TSN-2, CBS)
Shilique Calhoun, Michigan State (AP-3, WCFF-2)
Kenny Clark, UCLA (AP-3)
Sheldon Day, Notre Dame (AP-2, USAT)
Myles Garrett, Texas A&M (AP-3, WCFF-1, FWAA)
Shaq Lawson, Clemson -- CONSENSUS -- (AP-1, WCFF-1, FWAA, AFCA, TSN-2, USAT, ESPN)
Carl Nassib, Penn State -- UNANIMOUS -- (AP-1, WCFF-1, FWAA, TSN-1, AFCA, CBS, SI, ESPN, Athlon)
Robert Nkemdiche, Ole Miss (AP-3, WCFF-2)
Emmanuel Ogbah, Oklahoma State (TSN-1, WCFF-2)
A'Shawn Robinson, Alabama -- CONSENSUS -- (AP-1, FWAA, AFCA, TSN-1, WCFF-2, CBS, SI, Athlon)
Adolphus Washington, Ohio State (TSN-1)

Linebacker
Kentrell Brothers, Missouri (AP-2, TSN-2, WCFF-2, CBS, SI, Athlon)
Su'a Cravens, Southern California (AP-3)
Tyler Matakevich, Temple -- CONSENSUS -- (AP-1, WCFF-1, FWAA, AFCA, TSN-2, USAT, ESPN)
Blake Martinez, Stanford (AP-3)
Raekwon McMillan, Ohio State (WCFF-2)
Reggie Ragland, Alabama -- UNANIMOUS -- (AP-1, WCFF-1, FWAA, AFCA, TSN-1, USAT, CBS, SI, ESPN, Athlon)
Joe Schobert, Wisconsin (AP-3, FWAA, TSN-2, WCFF-2, ESPN)
Jaylon Smith, Notre Dame -- CONSENSUS -- (AP-1, WCFF-1, TSN-1, AFCA, USAT, CBS, SI, Athlon)
Eric Striker, Oklahoma (AP-2, TSN-1, SI)
Anthony Walker, Northwestern (AP-3)

Defensive back
Mackensie Alexander, Clemson (AP-3)
Vonn Bell, Ohio State (AP-1, TSN-1, SI, Athlon)
Jeremy Cash, Duke -- UNANIMOUS -- (AP-1, WCFF-1, FWAA, TSN-1, AFCA, USAT, CBS, SI, ESPN, Athlon)
Trae Elston, Ole Miss (AP-2)
Vernon Hargreaves, Florida -- UNANIMOUS -- (AP-1, WCFF-1, FWAA, TSN-1, AFCA, CBS)
Eddie Jackson, Alabama (AP-3, WCFF-2)
Jayron Kearse, Clemson (AP-2, ESPN)
Desmond King, Iowa -- UNANIMOUS -- (AP-1, WCFF-1, FWAA, TSN-1, AFCA, USAT, CBS, SI, ESPN, Athlon)
Jourdan Lewis, Michigan (AP-2, WCFF-2, USAT, SI)
Shawun Lurry, Northern Illinois (AP-3, FWAA, WCFF-2)
Marcus Maye, Florida (USAT)
Jalen Mills, LSU (CBS)
Jabrill Peppers, Michigan (TSN-2)
Jalen Ramsey, Florida State -- CONSENSUS -- (AP-2, WCFF-1, AFCA, TSN-2, ESPN, Athlon)
Zack Sanchez, Oklahoma (TSN-2, WCFF-2)
Teez Tabor, Florida (TSN-2)
Darian Thompson, Boise State (AP-3)

Special teams

Kicker
Roberto Aguayo, Florida State (TSN-1, CBS)
Daniel Carlson, Auburn (WCFF-2)
Jake Elliott, Memphis (AP-2, USAT, WCFF-2, ESPN)
Ka'imi Fairbairn, UCLA -- CONSENSUS -- (AP-1, WCFF-1, FWAA, AFCA, TSN-2, SI, Athlon)
Aidan Schneider, Oregon (AP-3)

Punter
Michael Carrizosa, San Jose State (WCFF-2)
Tom Hackett, Utah -- UNANIMOUS -- (AP-1, WCFF-1, FWAA, TSN-1, AFCA, USAT, SI, ESPN, Athlon)
Drew Kaser, Texas A&M (AP-2, TSN-2, CBS)
Hayden Hunt, Colorado State (AP-3)

All-purpose / return specialist
Evan Berry, Tennessee -- CONSENSUS -- (WCFF-1, TSN-1, SI)
Morgan Burns, Kansas State (AP-2, TSN-2, USAT, CBS, Athlon)
Antonio Callaway, Florida (CBS)
Jakeem Grant, Texas Tech (AP-3)
Christian Kirk, Texas A&M (Athlon)
William Likely, Maryland (FWAA)
Christian McCaffrey, Stanford -- CONSENSUS -- (AP-1, FWAA, WCFF-2, CBS, SI, ESPN)
Dante Pettis, Washington (TSN-2)
Cameron Sutton, Tennessee (TSN-1)
Ryan Switzer, North Carolina (AFCA)

See also
 2015 All-SEC football team
 2015 All-Big Ten Conference football team
 2015 All-Big 12 Conference football team
 2015 All-Pac-12 Conference football team

Notes

References
Sporting News All-America Team 
Football Writers Association of America All-America Team
Associated Press All-America team 
Walter Camp All-America team
USA Today All-America team
CBS Sports All-America team
Sports Illustrated All-America team
ESPN.com All-America Team
Athlon Sports All-America Team

All-America Team
College Football All-America Teams